Caryma Sa'd is a Canadian lawyer and citizen journalist. She is known for documenting events at anti-COVID-19-lockdown protests in Canada, and also as a landlord-tenant lawyer. She is a former executive director of Canada's branch of the National Organization for the Reform of Marijuana Laws (NORML).

Early life and education 
Sa'd was born to an Indian mother and a Palestinian father, and grew up in Mississauga, Ontario. She studied law at the University of Ottawa.

Legal career 
After articling in a Bay Street law firm, and working for Lenczner Slaght Royce Smith Griffin LLP, Sa'd launched her own practice that specializes in criminal, housing, and cannabis law in 2017. She serves on the board of directors of Legal Line, and in 2019 ran unsuccessfully to be a bencher at the Law Society of Ontario, finishing in 28th place.

In 2019, Sa'd represented tenants displaced by a fatal fire from 235 Gosford Boulevard apartment block in Toronto. She organized an open letter to Toronto Mayor John Tory, requesting him to block reoccupation of the building until air quality issues were addressed.

Also in 2019, Sa'd described Ontario's lottery system of providing retail cannabis licences as "unfair" because it excluded potential licensees based on luck, not experience or relevant skills. In 2021, she campaigned for the rights of small cannabis businesses, and criticized Facebook and Instagram for blocking their posts despite the legality of selling cannabis in Canada.

In 2021, Sa'd represented tenants who rented illegal apartments from Toronto landlord Brad J. Lamb, pushing for financial compensation for those evicted, and persuaded a judge to give more time to two tenants whose rent was delayed due to hardship caused by the COVID-19 pandemic.

Art and activism 
Sa'd has commissioned cartoons that are critical of corporations, public figures, and politicians. Sa'd co-founded 420 Cannabis Court, an outdoor comedy venue. As of 2021, she was the executive director for Canada's branch of the National Organization for the Reform of Marijuana Laws (NORML).

Throughout 2021, Sa'd documented and published footage of anti-vaccination and COVID-19 anti-lockdown protests in Toronto. In July 2021, she invited anti-lockdown activist Chris Sky to appear in front of an audience at her venue in Toronto's Chinatown for a live interview. A community group, Friends of Chinatown, and other tenants in the mall that the interview was to be held in urged her to cancel the event due to concerns for community safety. Sa'd refused the request but the event was cancelled nevertheless after "community and anti-fascist groups showed up to confront Sky and police had to be called to break up a number of scuffles."

In 2022, she spent weeks in Ottawa working as a citizen journalist, documenting the Canada convoy protest before live tweeting the bail hearings of Pat King and Tamara Lich.

Sa'd was arrested for trespassing by Ontario Provincial Police on May 26, 2022, as she tried to enter political rally for Doug Ford at the John C. Munro Hamilton International Airport. Charges were dropped on November 8, 2022.

Family life 
Sa'd's father died of COVID-19 in March 2021.

References 

1980 births
Living people
Activists from Ontario
Comedians from Ontario
Canadian women lawyers
Canadian women comedians
Canadian cannabis activists
Lawyers in Ontario
People from Mississauga
Internet culture
Citizen journalists
21st-century Canadian comedians
21st-century Canadian lawyers
Canada convoy protest
Canadian political commentators
Canadian people of Palestinian descent
Canadian people of Indian descent